External memory graph traversal is a type of graph traversal optimized for accessing externally stored memory.

Background
Graph traversal is a subroutine in most graph algorithms. The goal of a graph traversal algorithm is to visit (and / or process) every node of a graph. Graph traversal algorithms, like breadth-first search and depth-first search, are analyzed using the von Neumann model, which assumes uniform memory access cost. This view neglects the fact, that for huge instances part of the graph resides on disk rather than internal memory. Since accessing the disk is magnitudes slower than accessing internal memory, the need for efficient traversal of external memory exists.

External memory model 
For external memory algorithms the external memory model by Aggarwal and Vitter is used for analysis. A machine is specified by three parameters: M, B and D.
M is the size of the internal memory, B is the block size of a disk and D is the number of parallel disks.
The measure of performance for an external memory algorithm is the number of I/Os it performs.

External memory breadth-first search 
The breadth-first search algorithm starts at a root node and traverses every node with depth one. If there are no more unvisited nodes at the current depth, nodes at a higher depth are traversed. Eventually, every node of the graph has been visited.

Munagala and Ranade 

For an undirected graph , Munagala and Ranade  proposed the following external memory algorithm:

Let  denote the nodes in breadth-first search level t and let  be the multi-set of neighbors of level t-1.

This step requires  I/Os.

A visualization of the three described steps necessary to compute L(t) is depicted in the figure on the right.

Mehlhorn and Meyer 
Mehlhorn and Meyer proposed an algorithm that is based on the algorithm of Munagala and Ranade (MR) and improves their result.

It consists of two phases. In the first phase the graph is preprocessed, the second phase performs a breadth-first search using the information gathered in phase one.

During the preprocessing phase the graph is partitioned into disjointed subgraphs  with small diameter.

The breadth-first search phase is similar to the MR algorithm. In addition the algorithm maintains a sorted external file . Further, the nodes of any created breadth-first search level carry identifiers for the files  of their respective subgraphs . Instead of using random accesses to construct  the file  is used.

 The adjacency lists for the remaining nodes that could not be found in  need to be fetched. A scan over  yields the partition identifiers. After sorting and deletion of duplicates, the respective files  can be concatenated into a temporary file .
Next, the remaining adjacency lists are merged into  with a single pass.
  is created by a simple scan.
 The algorithm proceeds like the MR algorithm.

The overall number of I/Os for this algorithm is

External memory depth-first search 
The depth-first search algorithm explores a graph along each branch as deep as possible, before backtracing.

For directed graphs Buchsbaum, Goldwasser, Venkatasubramanian and Westbrook proposed an algorithm with  I/Os.

This algorithm is based on a data structure called buffered repository tree (BRT). It stores a multi-set of items from an ordered universe. Items are identified by key. A BTR offers two operations:
 insert(T, x), which adds item x to T and needs  amortized I/Os. N is the number of items added to the BTR.
 extract(T, k), which reports and deletes from T all items with key k. It requires  I/Os, where S is the size of the set returned by extract.

The algorithm simulates an internal depth-first search algorithm. A stack S of nodes is hold. During an iteration for the node v on top of S push an unvisited neighbor onto S and iterate. If there are no unvisited neighbors pop v.

The difficulty is to determine whether a node is unvisited without doing  I/Os per edge. To do this for a node v incoming edges (x,v) are put into a BRT D, when v is first discovered. Further, outgoing edges (v,x) are put into a priority queue P(v), keyed by the rank in the adjacency list.

For vertex u on top of S all edges (u,x) are extracted from D. Such edges only exist if x has been discovered since the last time u was on top of S (or since the start of the algorithm if u is the first time on top of S). For every edge (u,x) a delete(x) operation is performed on P(u). Finally a delete-min operation on P(u) yields the next unvisited node. If P(u) is empty, u is popped from S.

Pseudocode for this algorithm is given below.

 1  procedure BGVW-depth-first-search(G, v):
 2      let S be a stack, P[] a priority queue for each node and D a BRT
 3      S.push(v)
 4      while S is not empty
 5          v = S.top()
 6          if v is not marked:
 7              mark(v)
 8          extract all edges (v, x) from D, x: P[v].delete(x)
 9          if u = P[v].delete-min() not null
 10             S.push(u)
 11         else
 12             S.pop()
 
 13  procedure mark(v)
 14      put all edges (x, v) into D
 15       (v, x): put x into P[v]

References  

Articles with example pseudocode
External memory algorithms
Graph algorithms